Jean-Philippe is a French male given name. 

Notable people so named include:
 Jean-Philippe Baile
 Jean-Philippe Baratier (1721-1740), German scholar & child prodigy
 Jean-Philippe Belloc (born 1970), French race car driver
 Jean-Philippe Bergeron (writer)
 Jean-Philippe Bouchaud
 Jean-Philippe Brulé
 Jean-Philippe Caillet
 Jean-Philippe Charbonnier
 Jean-Philippe Collard
 Jean-Philippe Côté (born 1982), French-Canadian ice hockey player
 Jean-Philippe Darche, better known as J. P. Darche
 Jean-Philippe Daurelle
 Jean Philippe de Bela
 Jean-Philippe de Cheseaux (1718–1751), Swiss astronomer
 Jean-Philippe Dehon
 Jean-Philippe Douin
 Jean-Philippe Durand
 Jean Philippe Eugène de Mérode
 Jean-Philippe Faure
 Jean-Philippe Fleurian (born 1965), French tennis player
 Jean-Philippe Gatien
 Jean-Philippe Goncalves
 Jean-Philippe Goude
 Jean-Philippe Grandclaude
 Jean-Philippe Javary
 Jean-Philippe Jaworski
 Jean-Philippe Jodard (born 1966), French beach volleyball player
 Jean-Philippe Lauer
 Jean-Philippe Lecat
 Jean-Philippe Leguellec (born 1985), Canadian biathlete
 Jean-Philippe Levasseur
 Jean-Philippe Maitre
 Jean-Philippe Maurer
 Jean-Philippe Maury
 Jean-Philippe Mendy
 Jean-Philippe Rameau (1683-1784), French composer
 Jean-Philippe Rohr
 Jean-Philippe Roy
 Jean-Philippe Ruggia (born 1965), French motorcycle road racer
 Jean-Philippe Rykiel
 Jean-Philippe Sabo
 Jean-Philippe Salabreuil
 Jean-Philippe Stassen
 Jean-Philippe Susilovic (born 1975), Belgian television personality known as the Maître d' on the American reality show Hell's Kitchen
 Jean-Philippe Tremblay
 Jean-Philippe Toussaint
 Jean-Philippe Wispelaere
 Johnny Hallyday (born Jean-Philippe Smet in 1943), French singer and actor

Variants in different languages 
 Dutch : Jan Filip 
 German : Johann Philipp 
 English : John Philip 
 Italian : Gianfilippo 
 French : Jean-Philippe 
 Spanish : Juan Felipe 
 Portuguese : João Felipe 

Compound given names
French masculine given names